The Devil on Horseback is a 1936 American musical comedy film directed by Crane Wilbur and starring Lili Damita, Fred Keating, and Renee Torres. A separate Spanish-language version was also produced. It was based on a play written by Crane Wilber himself about a Latin American freedom fighter.

It was shot using the Cinecolor process.

Plot

Cast
 Lili Damita as Diane Corday 
 Fred Keating as Gary Owen 
 Francisco Flores del Campo as Pancho Granero 
 Jean Chatburn as Jane Evans 
 Tiffany Thayer as Wilbur Hitchcock 
 Renee Torres as Rosmond  
 Juan Torena as Juan Torres 
 Blanca Vischer as Manuela Torres 
 Enrique de Rosas as Col. Enrique Berea  
 Jack Stegall as Capt. de Reana

References

Bibliography
 Waldman, Harry & Slide, Anthony. Hollywood and the Foreign Touch: A Dictionary of Foreign Filmmakers and Their Films from America, 1910-1995. Scarecrow Press, 1996.

External links

 

1936 films
1936 musical comedy films
American musical comedy films
Films directed by Crane Wilbur
Grand National Films films
American multilingual films
1936 multilingual films
1930s English-language films
1930s American films